Ambrosia peruviana is a species of plant in the family Asteraceae. It occurs from Mexico south to Argentina, being common in the Antilles and the Andes.

In its native range, A. peruviana is used as a medicinal plant with analgesic, antiinflammatory, anthelmintic and antiseptic properties.

References

peruviana
Flora of Peru
Flora of Colombia
Flora of Ecuador
Flora of Bolivia